The Danish Women's Basketball Cup is the annual basketball cup competition held in Denmark. The first season of the competition was played in 1977. SISU is the all-time record holder with 14 titles.

Finals

References

External links
Latest seasons at scorespro.com
Cup winners at basket.dk

Basketball in Denmark
Basketball cup competitions in Europe